Ram Nath Mukhija is a senior business leader from Indian construction conglomerate Larsen & Toubro Limited, with corporate experience as a member of board of directors.

Mukhija is an Honours graduate in Electrical Engineering 1965 from IIT Kharagpur. He received the "Distinguished Alumnus" of IIT award. He established the Sushma Mukhija Memorial Scholarship in memory of his wife. He is on the Governing Board of Vivekanand Education Society's Institute of Technology, Mumbai.

Mukhija retired as a Board Member & President (Electrical & Electronics) at Larsen & Toubro Limited and is now an Advisor to the chairman in L&T. He is also an Independent Director on the Boards of Voltas Limited and Tata Auto Comp Systems Ltd. He is a former President of Indian Electrical and Electronics Manufacturers' Association (IEEMA).

References

Living people
Year of birth missing (living people)
Businesspeople from Mumbai
IIT Kharagpur alumni